Faucit is the surname of several people:

John Faucit Saville (1783?–1853), English actor, known as Mr Faucit
Harriet Elizabeth Savill  (1789–1857), English actress, known as Mrs Faucit
Helena Faucit (1817–1898), English actress

English-language surnames